CNN This Morning is an American morning show that airs on CNN, CNN International and HLN that premiered on November 1, 2022. Hosted by Don Lemon, Poppy Harlow, and Kaitlan Collins on weekdays, the program succeeded New Day as CNN's morning show, and shortly thereafter also replaced HLN's Morning Express with Robin Meade.

History 
Chris Licht became the head of CNN in April 2022, succeeding Jeff Zucker following WarnerMedia's merger with Discovery Inc. to form Warner Bros. Discovery. During the company's first upfronts in May 2022, Licht announced plans for a new CNN morning show, stating that "we are seeking to be a disruptor of broadcast morning shows in the space, we believe we have the people and resources to do this." 

Licht has had prior experience with establishing morning shows at his past employers, with a particular emphasis on formats focusing upon panel discussions. He launched Morning Joe at MSNBC in 2007, and CBS This Morning in 2012; the latter was initially CBS's most successful format in the timeslot in years, but began to see instability and declines in 2017 after the dismissal of Charlie Rose due to sexual harassment allegations, and was ultimately rebooted as CBS Mornings in 2021.

On September 15, CNN announced that Don Lemon would leave his primetime show Don Lemon Tonight and move to the new morning show, joined by fellow CNN anchors Poppy Harlow and Kaitlan Collins. On October 12, it was announced that the show will premiere on November 1 ahead of the U.S. midterm elections, and be titled CNN This Morning. 

On December 1, 2022, it was announced that the show would also be simulcast on HLN beginning on December 6, replacing Morning Express with Robin Meade. CNN This Morning is the only news program remaining on HLN, and reports indicate it is being retained solely to fulfil contractual obligations to provide news content, as that channel otherwise shifts to a full-time true crime format.

Personnel

Notable on-air staff
Weekdays
 Don Lemon, anchor (2022–present)
 Poppy Harlow, anchor (2022–present)
 Kaitlan Collins, anchor (2022–present)

Weekends
 Amara Walker (2022–present)
 Victor Blackwell (2023-present)
 Boris Sanchez (2022–2023)

References

2022 American television series debuts
2020s American television news shows
Television morning shows in the United States
CNN original programming
English-language television shows